David Eugene Tudor (January 20, 1926  – August 13, 1996) was an American pianist and composer of experimental music.

Life and career 
Tudor was born in Philadelphia, Pennsylvania. He studied piano with Irma Wolpe and composition with Stefan Wolpe and became known as one of the leading performers of avant garde piano music. He gave the first American performance of the Piano Sonata No. 2 by Pierre Boulez in 1950, and a European tour in 1954 greatly enhanced his reputation. Karlheinz Stockhausen dedicated his Klavierstück VI (1955) to Tudor. Tudor also gave early performances of works by Morton Feldman, Earle Brown, Christian Wolff and La Monte Young.

The composer with whom Tudor is particularly associated is John Cage; he gave the premiere of Cage's Music of Changes, Concert For Piano and Orchestra and the notorious 4' 33". Cage said that many of his pieces were written either specifically for Tudor to perform or with him in mind, once stating "what you had to do was to make a situation that would interest him. That was the role he played." The two worked closely together on many of Cage's pieces, both works for piano and electronic pieces, including for the Smithsonian Folkways album: Indeterminacy: New Aspect of Form in Instrumental and Electronic Music (1959). Tudor also performs on several recordings of Cage's music, including the Mainstream record of Cartridge Music, the recording on Columbia Records of Variations II, and the two Everest records of Variations IV. Tudor selected the works to be performed for the 25th Anniversary Retrospective Concert of the music of John Cage (May 16, 1958), and performed in the premiere of the Concert For Piano and Orchestra given as the closing work for that concert. Moreover, Tudor received a Foundation for Contemporary Arts John Cage Award (1992).

After a stint teaching at Darmstadt from 1956 to 1961, Tudor began to wind up his activities as a pianist to concentrate on composing. He wrote mostly electronic works, many commissioned by Cage's partner, choreographer Merce Cunningham. His homemade musical circuits are considered landmarks in live electronic music and electrical instrument building as a form of composition. One piece, Reunion (1968), written jointly with Lowell Cross features a chess game, where each move triggers a lighting effect or projection. At the premiere, the game was played between John Cage and Marcel Duchamp. Reunion is erroneously attributed to Cage in James Pritchett's book The Music Of John Cage. Rain Forest is a sound installation created from constructed sculpture and everyday objects such as a metal barrel, a vintage computer disk, and plastic tubing which served as a musical accompaniment. (David Tudor and Composers Inside Electronics Inc.: Rain forest V (variation 1))

In 1969, Tudor set up India's first electronic music studio at the National Institute of Design in Ahmedabad.

Upon Cage's death in 1992, Tudor took over as music director of the Merce Cunningham Dance Company. Among many works created for the company, Tudor composed Soundings: Ocean Diary (1994), the electronic component of Ocean, which was conceived by John Cage and Merce Cunningham, with choreography by Merce Cunningham, orchestral music by Andrew Culver and design by Marsha Skinner.

Tudor died after a series of strokes in Tomkins Cove, New York at the age of 70.

Piano Realisations 
From 1951 until the late 1960s, Tudor (mainly as pianist) regularly performed the indeterminate work of John Cage. Throughout this time, "all of the music [Cage] composed", John Holzaepfel contends, "was written with one person in mind", and this person was Tudor. The culmination of this period were works that required a significant imprint of Tudor in performance. Winter Music (1957), for example, comprises a score of twenty pages, that each contain from one to 61 cluster-chords per page, with the performer deciding which of these to play. In his realisations of these scores, Tudor "pin[ned] them down like butterflies", making the indeterminate determined, such that each performance of these works was consistent with the last. He chose to 'fix' his interpretation, such that he never improvised  from the score, and rather each performance of Winter Music by Tudor was consistent across time. As Martin Iddon explains: "Tudor's practice was, broadly, to create a single realisation and then to use that version of the piece in all subsequent recordings".

Despite the significant role Tudor had in the creative act, "during his years as a pianist, Tudor never considered himself as a composer, or even a co-composer, of the music he played".

However, Ben Piekut argues differently, drawing from the work of Bruno Latour. These fixed realisations are examples of 'distributed authorship' where "the conception, meaning and sound-world of a given composition is shared across multiple subjectivities". The conception and meaning of the work for Cage is always created with Tudor in mind, and thus shared across the subjectivities of these two actors. Similarly, the output 'sound-world' is shared in that Tudor's function in realising the score is decision making based on Cage's stimuli (score), and Cage's stimuli does not present a coherent sound-world on its own. Piekut goes on to align this creative-distribution with Cage's Buddhist anti-ego worldview.

See also
 Avant-garde music
 Indeterminacy (music)
 Joan La Barbara
 9 Evenings: Theatre and Engineering
 Sea Tails

References

Further reading

External links
 Tudor Website
 Finding Aid for David Tudor papers, Getty Research Institute
 The Art of David Tudor: Audio and Video
 Lovely Music Biographies: David Tudor
 Indeterminacy: New Aspect of Form in Instrumental and Electronic Music Album Details at Smithsonian Folkways
 David Tudor interview, April 7, 1986

1926 births
1996 deaths
20th-century classical composers
20th-century classical pianists
20th-century American composers
20th-century American pianists
20th-century American male musicians
American classical composers
American male classical composers
American classical pianists
American male pianists
Avant-garde pianists
Contemporary classical music performers
Experimental composers
Experiments in Art and Technology collaborating artists
Male classical pianists
Black Mountain College faculty
Classical musicians from Pennsylvania
Musicians from Philadelphia
Designers at National Institute of Design